Mparo is a village in Hoima District, in the Western Region of Uganda. It is the location of the "Mparo Tombs", one of the Royal burial sites of the Bunyoro Kingdom.

Location
The coordinates of Mparo, Hoima are:01°26'08.0"N, 31°23'56.0"E (Latitude:1.435556; Longitude:31.398889).

Overview
The Mparo Tombs are a historical cultural site.  The royal tombs are the burial site of Omukama (‘King’) Chwa II Kabalega who reigned in Bunyoro Kitara in the late 19th century. He was exiled to the Seychelles in 1899, by the British colonialists. Inside are his spears, bowls, throne and other personal effects on display above the actual place of interment. Also buried at the site is the late Sir Tito Winyi IV, father of the current Omukama, Rukirabasaija Agutamba Solomon Gafabusa Iguru I.

See also
Mparo, Rukiga

References

External links
Hoima Gets UShs7 Billion for Development

Hoima
Hoima District
Ugandan culture
Tourist attractions in Uganda
Populated places in Western Region, Uganda